Glenn Reed "Sparky" Adams Jr. (April 4, 1917 – March 31, 2011) was an American professional basketball player. He played for the Sheboygan Red Skins in the National Basketball League for two seasons and averaged 4.7 points per game. In his post-basketball career, Adams embarked on a 35-year career with the U.S. Immigration and Naturalization Service.

References

1917 births
2011 deaths
American men's basketball players
Basketball players from Illinois
Forwards (basketball)
Marquette Golden Eagles men's basketball players
People from Carpentersville, Illinois
Sheboygan Red Skins players
20th-century American people